Matthew Percy (born: 1 October 1962) is a sailor from Queensland Australia. who represented the America's cup defence team with Allan Bond, in Perth Australia 1987, his position on the yacht was the sewer man up on the foredeck packing and hoisting sails most of Tiny's time was spent on Australia IV. Who later represented his country at the 1988 Summer Olympics in Busan, South Korea as crew member in the Soling. With helmsman Bob Wilmot and fellow crew members Glenn Read they took the 14th place.

References

Living people
1962 births
Sailors at the 1988 Summer Olympics – Soling
Olympic sailors of Australia
Australian male sailors (sport)
20th-century Australian people